Marisa may refer to:

 Marisa (town), an Indonesian town
 Marisa, Hellenised name of Maresha, town in Idumea (today in Israel)
 Marisa (given name), a feminine personal name
 Marisa (gastropod), a genus of apple snails
 MV Marisa (1937), a Dutch ship torpedoed in 1941; see List of shipwrecks in May 1941
 Marisa, a Sudanese form of millet beer